The Kynrem Falls is located  from Cherrapunji in East Khasi Hills district in the Indian state of Meghalaya. It is situated inside the Thangkharang Park. It is  the 7th  highest waterfalls in India. The fall spreads out in two different streams or rivulets with each of them gaining momentum by getting merged while flowing down the last leg of the third tier.

See also
List of waterfalls in India
List of waterfalls in India by height

References 

East Khasi Hills district
Waterfalls of Meghalaya